Pârgărești is a commune in Bacău County, Western Moldavia, Romania. It is composed of five villages: Bahna, Nicorești, Pârâu Boghii, Pârgărești and Satu Nou.

References

Communes in Bacău County
Localities in Western Moldavia